Alwyn Glenn Hugill (born 8 February 1970 in Darlington, County Durham) is an English television presenter, actor, musician and producer. He is best known for playing policeman Alan McKenna in Coronation Street during the 1990s, presenting The Mole and as the executive producer and Banker on Deal or No Deal. In early 2023, he sold his production company, Possessed, to ITV and became C.C.O. of Wheelhouse, the media empire founded by Jimmy Kimmel.

He was previously managing director of the independent TV production company, Possessed, which became one of the most successful production companies in the UK.

He grew up in Barnard Castle and was educated at the independent Barnard Castle School and Christ Church, Oxford.

In 1980, as a ten-year-old schoolboy, he scored a 207 in a national IQ test designed for under 16s. It was the highest recorded result in the country. Local newspaper The Northern Echo then reported he took another test designed for adults and recorded a result of 177, the highest score the test was capable of registering.

At senior school, he developed an interest in music, film and television alongside classmate and lifelong friend Giles Deacon, now a major fashion designer. In interview, Deacon has recalled re Hugill "We both didn't really like the town we lived in and used to go and look at all the record covers in HMV in Newcastle; that was sort of an initial portal to other things that we didn't really know about. This when we were both about thirteen! That led onto an interest in music scenes, like Joy Division and early New Order, and various other bands".

He presented the UK version of The Mole and was the executive producer of Channel 4 game show Deal or No Deal. It was suggested (by Richard Osman in The Metro, 23 February 2015) that he was also the mysterious individual known on the show as "The Banker" and on 19 October 2015, it was confirmed on This Morning by Stephen Mulhern.  Whilst Stephen was talking about his new show Pick Me!, he mentioned that Glenn was the producer of this new show and The Banker behind Deal or No Deal  Metro also describes this as "a little disappointing", as it was considered predictable as "it makes sense that the person offering contestants large sums of money is the producer". He has produced or created many other game shows as well as Deal or No Deal, such as Playing It Straight, Beauty and the Geek, Cash Cab, Pointless, Two Tribes, Pick Me!, Divided, and most recently 5 Gold Rings, Moneyball, Unbeatable and Sitting on a Fortune.

He is also a successful writer with credits including the Deal or No Deal annual, the series Beauty and the Geek for Channel 4, Sky TV's Hollywood Autopsy and the reality crime series Texas S.W.A.T. in the USA.

He began his career as an actor and director, most recognisable for his time as Alan McKenna in Coronation Street. However he also had a stage career including major roles for the Royal Shakespeare Company and Steppenwolf Theatre Company.

He also worked as a voice artist, appearing in numerous adverts and on the stunt series Mission Implausible on Sky One presented by Jason Plato and Tania Zaetta, The Whole 19 Yards on ITV1, and the Charlie Brooker series How TV Ruined Your Life and Screenwipe.

He is also a composer and musician, working as a director of Possessed Music Box, which supplies the music for many of his television shows.

In 2008 the Daily Star reported that the success of Deal or No Deal had made him a millionaire.

In 2014 Hugill founded Possessed, a television production company. He has gone on to create shows such as Cash Trapped, hosted by  Bradley Walsh and 5 Gold Rings, hosted by Philip Schofield. The company won a Rose D'Or in 2016 for Best Gameshow of the year for Pick Me!. They went on to be nominated again for Best Gameshow in 2018 for 5 Gold Rings. In the autumn of 2021 Possessed, had two prime time gameshows on air at the weekends on ITV - Moneyball (game show) and Sitting On A Fortune. They have two BBC gameshows in Catchpoint and Unbeatable.

He is a fervent supporter of Sunderland AFC.

Personal life
He is married and has two children, one born on March the 1st 2011, and the other on Christmas day, 2013.

References

External links

British television presenters
1970 births
Living people
People educated at Barnard Castle School
People from Barnard Castle
Alumni of Christ Church, Oxford
English television actors
English soap opera actors
English television producers
Actors from County Durham
People from Darlington